Platyptilia humida is a moth of the family Pterophoridae. It is known from Kenya.

References 

humida
Endemic moths of Kenya
Moths described in 1920
Moths of Africa